Lady Put the Light Out is an album by Frankie Valli, released in November 1977 on the Private Stock label.

Background, composition and recording
Frankie Valli assembled some New York City session players for the album Lady Put the Light Out, and chose songs by songwriters such as Eric Carmen, Paul Anka, Carole Bayer Sager, and the team of Barry Mann and Cynthia Weil. The song "Native New Yorker", which was later covered in a hit version by the band Odyssey, was written by Sandy Linzer and Denny Randell, who had been writing songs for the Four Seasons since the 1960s. "I Need You" was also a hit for the band 3T.

Track listing
"I Need You" (Eric Carmen) – 3:23
"Second Thoughts" (Paul Anka) – 3:15
"I Could Have Loved You" (Albert Hammond, Carole Bayer Sager) – 3:28
"With You" (Carole Bayer Sager, Ken Ascher) – 3:48
"Native New Yorker" (Denny Randell, Sandy Linzer) – 5:18
"Lady Put the Light Out" (Guy Fletcher, Doug Flett) – 4:28
"Boats Against the Current" (Eric Carmen) – 4:03
"Rainstorm" (Chris Andrews) – 3:55
"I'm Gonna Love You" (Barry Mann, Cynthia Weil) – 3:04
"There's Always a Goodbye" (Randy Richards) – 4:06

Personnel
Frankie Valli – vocals
David Spinozza, Jay Berliner, Jeff Layton, Jeff Mironov, John Tropea, Lance Quinn, Vinnie Bell – guitar
Bob Babbitt, Gordon Edwards, Wilbur Bascomb – bass
Kenny Ascher, Richard Tee – keyboards
Larry Fast – synthesizer
Allan Schwartzberg, Steve Gadd – drums
David Friedman – percussion
Richie Gajate-Garcia – congas
Marvin Stamm – horns
Gene Orloff – strings
Margaret Ross – harp
Helen Miles, Hilda Harris, Lani Groves, Linda November, Ullanda McCullough, Vivian Cherry, Yvonne Lewis – backing vocals

References

1977 albums
Frankie Valli albums
Private Stock Records albums
Albums arranged by Charles Calello
Albums produced by Charles Calello